Montepaone is a town and comune of the province of Catanzaro in the Calabria region of southern Italy.

Geography
Montepaone sits on the Italian Ionian sea in the Gulf of Squillace.  Soverato, Gasperina, Montauro are nearby towns.

Economy
Montepaone is highly reliant on seasonal tourism both from Italian-Americans visiting family in the region and from Northern Italians. The work force in the town is around 19% of the total population.

References

External links
 Official website
 Information in English on Montepaone

Cities and towns in Calabria